Zodiac: The Race Begins is a CGI film produced by Singapore's Cubix Pictures. The film was released in the city state on January 26, 2006.

It is Singapore's first 3D animated film and recounts the legend behind the ancient Chinese zodiac on how 12 animals came to be chosen as its symbols. Its script, researched by Singapore-based freelance playwright and former cross-talk celebrity Zhao Jin, incorporates eight myths.

In 2007, it was released in Malaysia and the Philippines on Disney Channel Asia in English.

Cast
35 artists were cast in the voiceovers for the show. This includes prominent Singaporean actress Fann Wong and popular Singaporean DJ Dennis Chew.
 Dennis Chew as the Rooster, the Rat, Evil court official
Tom Arnold as Ringo the Rat (American English)
 Fann Wong as the Snake
 Jamie Yeo
 Vernetta Lopez
 Colin Gomez

Critical response
Brian Costello of Common Sense Media gave this film a 1/5 stars, writing that the film "is rife with unlistenable songs, unlikeable characters, terrible acting, and the thinnest of storylines".

References

External links

Today Online (PDF)
Article at Twitch

2006 films
2006 animated films
2006 computer-animated films
Animated feature films
Chinese mythology in popular culture
2000s Mandarin-language films
Singaporean animated films